Punta Cala Scirocco Lighthouse is an active lighthouse located on the southernmost extremity of Gorgona, one of the islands of the Tuscan Archipelago,  from Livorno.

Description
The lighthouse is fully automated and is operated by Marina Militare identified by the code number 1992 E.F.

See also
 List of lighthouses in Italy
 Gorgona

References

External links 
 Servizio Fari Marina Militare 

Lighthouses in Tuscany
Gorgona (Italy)
Buildings and structures in Livorno
Lighthouses in Italy